Syed Muhammad Salim (born 5 September 1909, date of death unknown) was an Olympic field hockey player from Pakistan. He played seven matches for Pakistan's national hockey team. He was part of the Pakistan team in field hockey at the 1948 Summer Olympics

See also
 Field hockey at the 1948 Summer Olympics – Men's team squads
 List of Pakistani field hockey players

References

External links
 

1909 births
Year of death missing
Olympic field hockey players of Pakistan
Pakistani male field hockey players
Field hockey players at the 1948 Summer Olympics
Field hockey players from Lahore